The Agenzia Informazioni e Sicurezza Interna (Italian for "Internal Information and Security Agency"), commonly known as AISI, is the security agency of Italy. The AISI is the successor of the Servizio per le Informazioni e la Sicurezza Democratica (SISDE) which was disbanded, and replaced by Dipartimento delle Informazioni per la Sicurezza, after the Act of August 3, 2007 No 124 which restructured the Italian intelligence community. Article 6 of this act clearly prohibits the agency from conducting operations outside Italy. 

Counterparts in other countries include the United Kingdom’s MI5, United States' NSA and the Russian FSB. 

The first director of the agency was Franco Gabrielli, who had led SISDE until it was disbanded. He was replaced by Carabinieri general Giorgio Piccirillo in 2009. The motto of the agency is "scientia rerum reipublicae salus" (knowledge of issues is the salvation of the Republic).

See also
Italian intelligence agencies

Italian intelligence agencies
Domestic intelligence agencies